Carurú Airport is an airport serving the river town of Carurú in the Vaupés Department of Colombia.

The runway parallels the Vaupés River, an eventual tributary of the Amazon River.

See also

Transport in Colombia
List of airports in Colombia

References

External links
OpenStreetMap - Carurú
OurAirports - Carurú
FallingRain - Carurú Airport
HERE/Nokia - Carurú

Airports in Colombia